Claudia Carroll (born c. 1969) is an Irish author and actress.  She has been a regular on the RTÉ One soap opera Fair City.

Life and work
Born in Dublin where she still lives, Carroll was educated in University College Dublin, the College of Music in Dublin and of the Gaiety School of Acting. She plays the character of Nicola Prendergast on the Irish TV soap Fair City appearing in the role for fourteen years. While she was working Carroll was also writing her first novel in her dressing room. That book was published in 2004. Eventually she left the show in 2007 and focused on her writing although she has made guest appearances of her character.

Bibliography

Novels
 He Loves Me Not...He Loves Me 2004
 Remind Me Again Why I Need A Man 2005
 The Last Of The Great Romantics 2005
 I Never Fancied Him Anyway 2007
 Do you want to know a secret 2008
 If This is Paradise, I Want My Money Back 2009
 Personally I Blame My Fairy Godmother 2010
 Will You Still Love Me Tomorrow? 2011
 A Very Accidental Love Story 2012
 Me and You 2013
 Love Me or Leave Me 2014
 Meet Me In Manhattan 2015
 All She Ever Wished For 2016

Short stories
 All I Want For Christmas (with others) 2012
 The Perfect Escape: Romantic short stories to relax with (with other writers) 2013
 Single, Forty and Fabulous!: A Love...Maybe Valentine eShort 2015
 Love...Maybe: The Must-Have Eshort Collection (with others) 2015
 In A New York Minute 2015

Others
 REMEMBRANCE WRITING 101 The Easy Way to Write and Share the Stories of Your Life, A Guidebook 2011

References 

 

Irish women novelists
Actresses from Dublin (city)
Living people
20th-century Irish actresses
21st-century Irish writers
1960s births
21st-century Irish actresses
Irish soap opera actresses
21st-century Irish women writers
Writers from Dublin (city)